Little Skellig (Irish: Sceilig Bheag) is an unhabitable island in the Atlantic Ocean, 11 km south-west of Valentia Island in County Kerry, Ireland. It is smaller than Skellig Michael (54 acres), its twin island. The two islands rose c. 374–360 million years ago during a period of mountain formation, along with the MacGillycuddy's Reeks mountain range. Later, they were separated from the mainland by rising water levels.

Geography 
Little Skellig is the smaller of the two Skellig Islands, the other being Skellig Michael, 1 km to the south-west.  The island has a large bird population, including a colony of northern gannets which is the largest in Ireland,  and one of the largest in the world. The island, together with Skellig Michael, is the centre of a 364 ha Important Bird Area established by BirdWatch Ireland in 2000.

Access
Landing on Little Skellig is not permitted. BirdWatch Ireland has designated Little Skellig as a nature preserve. It houses over 35,000 colonies of Gannets.

Popular culture 
The "Skellige Isles" or "Skellige" in the series The Witcher is based on the Skellig Islands. The word Skellig(e) derives from the Irish (Gaeilge) "Sceilg", which can be translated into "Rock" or "Cliff".

References

Sources
 
 

Skellig Islands
Uninhabited islands of Ireland
Important Bird Areas of the Republic of Ireland
Nature reserves in the Republic of Ireland
Protected areas of County Kerry
Seabird colonies